—The world reflected in a puddle— is Yui Horie's first solo album with mostly original content but also featuring versions of the Love Hina songs "Yakusoku" and "Happy Happy Rice Shower".

Track listing
 桜    (Sakura, Cherry blossom)
 Insistence
 おはよう    (Ohayō, Good morning)
 ラブリー    (Raburii, Lovely)
 着心地の悪い恋なんて    (Kigokochi no warui koi nante, I don't need love, it's uncomfortable to wear)
 約束 ~eternal promise~    (Yakusoku, Promise)
 洗濯機の中から    (Sentakuki no naka kara, From the inside of a washing machine)
 愛のカタチ    (Ai no katachi, The shape of love)
 スコールクロール    (Sukōru Kurōru, Squall crawl)
 Happy happy rice shower - type Yui
 I wish
 Happy love to you

Yui Horie albums
2000 albums